Paulo Heitor Boracini, also known as Paulinho (born December 26, 1984) is a Brazilian-Italian professional basketball player, who plays for Bauru of São Paulo, Brazil.

Professional career
Paulinho was traded to Joinville before the third NBB season, to be the starting point guard of the team. He had previously played in teams like Pinheiros, Minas, Paulistano, Beijing Ducks (China) and Jesi (Italy).

National team career
Paulinho was a member of the senior men's Brazilian national basketball team for the training camp of the national team on the road to the 2010 FIBA World Championship in Turkey.

References

External links
LatinBasket.com Profile
Italian 2nd Division Profile 

1984 births
Living people
Associação Bauru Basketball players
Beijing Ducks players
Brazilian men's basketball players
Club Athletico Paulistano basketball players
Esporte Clube Pinheiros basketball players
Italian men's basketball players
Novo Basquete Brasil players
Point guards
Sportspeople from São Paulo (state)